Francis Joseph Haas (March 18, 1889 – August 29, 1953) was an American prelate of the Roman Catholic Church.  He served as the sixth bishop of the Diocese of Grand Rapids in Michigan from 1943 until his death in 1953.

An advocate for organized labor, Haas served as a U.S. Government labor mediator for major labor strikes before being appointed bishop.

Biography

Early life 
Francis Haas was born on March 18, 1889, in Racine, Wisconsin, to Peter Francis Haas and Mary Lucy O'Day. In 1904, he entered at St. Francis Seminary in St. Francis, Wisconsin.

Priesthood 
Haas was ordained on June 11, 1913, for the Archdiocese of Milwaukee by Bishop Joseph Maria Koudelka in Racine. After his ordination, Haas was assigned as an assistant pastor at Holy Rosary Parish in Milwaukee.  He also became a faculty member two years later at St. Francis Seminary.

In 1919, Haas entered the Catholic University of America in Washington, D.C., obtaining  a Doctor of Philosophy degree in 1922.Haas also attended Johns Hopkins University in Baltimore, Maryland.  After returning to Milwaukee in 1922, he started teaching economics at both St. Francis Seminary and Marquette University.  Haas also served as a member of the civil service examining board for Milwaukee County.

Haas returned to Washington in 1931 to become director of the National Catholic School of Social Service (NCSSS) at Catholic University.  He was also named by President Franklin Roosevelt in 1933 to the new National Labor Board in Washington.  On July 18, 1934, Haas travelled to Minneapolis, Minnesota to mediate a work stoppage by delivery truck drivers who belonged to the Teamsters Union.  With the onset of World War II,  Haas reportedly participated in the mediation of 1500 labor disputes.   

Leaving Washington in 1935, Haas was appointed rector of St. Francis Seminary in Wisconsin.  He received a Doctor of Law degree in 1936 from the University of Wisconsin.  Haas also served as president of the Catholic Association for International Peace.

Bishop of Grand Rapids 
In 1943, Hass resigned as chair of the President's Committee on Fair Employment Practice to become the bishop of Grand Rapids, Michigan. Pope Pius XII appointed him bishop on September 26, 1943, and he was consecrated by Archbishop Amleto Cicognani on November 18, 1943. 

He was a member of President Harry Truman's President's Committee on Civil Rights from 1946 to 1947.  In 1951, Haas published the book Man and Society.  It became a common college textbook for sociology classes.He hosted a National Liturgical Conference at the Grand Rapids Civic Auditorium in 1953

Death and legacy 
Francis Hass died on August 29, 1953, of a heart attack. The Bishop Haas Council 4362 of the Knights of Columbus in Wyoming, Michigan was named in his honor.

Awards 

 Award for fighting intolerance from the Jewish Workmen's Circle of Detroit - 1950
 Human rights award from the Michigan Congress of Industrial Organizations Council - 1952

References

Further reading 
Blantz, Thomas E. A priest in public service: Francis J. Haas and the New Deal. University of Notre Dame Press, 1982

External links 
 Francis J Haas Papers
 Biographical Sketch, Diocese of Grand Rapids

 

People from Racine, Wisconsin
History of labor relations in the United States
History of civil rights in the United States
Religion in Grand Rapids, Michigan
St. Francis Seminary (Wisconsin) alumni
Christianity in Michigan
Catholic University of America alumni
Religious leaders from Wisconsin
National Labor Relations Board officials
Johns Hopkins University alumni
1889 births
1953 deaths
Roman Catholic bishops of Grand Rapids
Roman Catholic Archdiocese of Milwaukee
Catholics from Wisconsin
20th-century Roman Catholic bishops in the United States